The 2021–22 UEFA Youth League Domestic Champions Path began on 28 September and ended on 8 December 2021. A total of 32 teams competed in the Domestic Champions Path to decide eight of the 24 places in the knockout phase (play-offs and the round of 16 onwards) of the 2021–22 UEFA Youth League.

Times listed here by CEST/CET.

Draw
The youth domestic champions of the top 32 associations according to their 2021 UEFA country coefficients entered the Domestic Champions Path. Should there was a vacancy (associations with no youth domestic competition, as well as youth domestic champions already included in the UEFA Champions League path), it was first filled by the title holders should they have not yet qualified, and then by the youth domestic champions of the next association in the UEFA ranking.

Akademia e Futbollit, Angers, Deportivo La Coruña, Daugavpils, Empoli, Hajduk Split, 1. FC Köln, Miercurea Ciuc, Pogoń Szczecin, St Patrick's Athletic, Trabzonspor, Žalgiris and Zvijezda 09 will make their tournament debuts. Lithuania will be represented for the first time.

For the Domestic Champions Path, the 32 teams were drawn into two rounds of two-legged home-and-away ties. The draw for both the first round and second round was held on 31 August 2021, at the UEFA headquarters in Nyon, Switzerland. There were no seedings, but the 32 teams were split into groups defined by sporting and geographical criteria prior to the draw.

In the first round, the 32 teams were split into four groups. Teams in the same group were drawn against each other, with the order of legs decided by draw.
In the second round, the sixteen winners of the first round, whose identity was not known at the time of the draw, were split into two groups: Group A contained the winners from Groups 1 and 2, while Group B contained the winners from Groups 3 and 4. Teams in the same group were drawn against each other, with the order of legs decided by draw.

Format
In the Domestic Champions Path, each tie is played over two legs, with each team playing one leg at home. The team that scores more goals on aggregate over the two legs advances to the next round. If the aggregate score is level, as the away goals rule has been scrapped early this season, the match will be decided by a penalty shoot-out with no extra time played.

The eight second round winners advance to the play-offs, where they are joined by the eight group runners-up from the UEFA Champions League Path.

First round

Summary

The first legs were played on 28, 29 and 30 September and the second legs were played on 19 and 20 October 2021.

|}

Matches

Deportivo La Coruña won 4–3 on aggregate.

MTK Budapest won 6–4 on aggregate.

Žilina won 7–1 on aggregate.

Hajduk Split won 5–1 on aggregate.

Minsk won 6–0 on aggregate.

Kairat won 2–1 on aggregate.

Maccabi Haifa won 5–0 on aggregate.

Genk won 7–3 on aggregate.

Septemvri Sofia won 4–1 on aggregate.

Trabzonspor won 3–0 on aggregate.

Empoli won 3–2 on aggregate.

AZ won 11–0 on aggregate.

Angers won 5–0 on aggregate.

Rangers won 5–1 on aggregate.

Midtjylland won 14–3 on aggregate.

Red Star Belgrade won 4–1 on aggregate.

Second round

Summary

|}
Notes

Matches

Hajduk Split won 4–1 on aggregate.

Genk won 3–1 on aggregate.

Deportivo La Coruña won 5–4 on aggregate.

3–3 on aggregate. Žilina won 3–0 on penalties.

Empoli won 6–1 on aggregate.

Midtjylland won 10–2 on aggregate.

1–1 on aggregate. AZ won 5–4 on penalties.

Rangers won 7–2 on aggregate.

Notes

References

External links

UEFA Youth League Matches: 2021–22, UEFA.com

2
October 2021 sports events in Europe
November 2021 sports events in Europe